Ulanda is an Ward in the Iringa Rural District of the Iringa Region of Tanzania, East Africa. In 2016 the Tanzania National Bureau of Statistics report there were 9,686 people in the ward, from 9,257 in 2012.

The 200 bed Tosamaganga Hospital is located in Ulanda ward. It is operated by a faith based organisation.

Villages / vitongoji 
The ward has 6 villages and 34 vitongoji.

 Mangalali
 Itunda A
 Itunda B
 Kikongoma
 Kitoo A
 Kitoo B
 Lukwambe A
 Lukwambe B
 Mangalali A
 Mangalali B
 Kibebe
 Ikanumgunda
 Ikanuulime
 Itamba
 Kilolo
 Lugung’unzi
 Lupange
 Nyambila
 Lupalama
 Lupalama-Kilimani
 Mjimwema
 Mlaga
 Mwangata
 Ibangamoyo
 Henge
 Ibangamoyo
 Katenge
 Mlandizi
 Mwika
 Mwambao
 Idete
 Kilimahewa
 Mwambao A
 Mwambao B
 Weru
 Imwagamapesa
 Ipangani
 Kilangali
 Magangwe
 Mseke

References 

Wards of Iringa Region